Bitica is a town in Litoral, Equatorial Guinea. It has a (2005 est.) population of 1464.

Populated places in Litoral (Equatorial Guinea)